Estevan Haniel Florial (born November 25, 1997) is a Dominican-Haitian professional baseball outfielder for the New York Yankees of Major League Baseball (MLB). He made his MLB debut in 2020.

Career

Background
Estevan Florial was born and raised in Santo Domingo, Dominican Republic. He holds dual-citizenship with Haiti due to his mother being born there. In the first couple of years with the Yankees organization, they mistakenly listed him as being born in Port-au-Prince, Haiti, which would have made him a forerunner to become the first Haitian-born Major League player. Florial signed with the New York Yankees under the name Haniel d'Oleo in 2014. However the contract was voided after he was unable to provide a birth certificate and he re-signed with the Yankees under the name, Estevan Florial in 2015. He made his professional debut that season with the Dominican Summer League Yankees 1 where he batted .313 with seven home runs and 53 RBIs in 57 games.

Minor leagues
He played in 2016 with the Pulaski Yankees, Charleston RiverDogs and Tampa Yankees, batting a combined .227 with eight home runs and thirty RBIs in 67 total games among  the three teams.

Florial started the 2017 season with Charleston. He was selected to appear in the All-Star Futures Game in July. After batting .297 with 11 home runs, 43 RBIs and 17 stolen bases for Charleston, he was promoted to Tampa in August, where he finished the season slashing .303/.368/.461 with two home runs and 14 RBIs in 19 games. The Yankees promoted him to the Trenton Thunder for their postseason but did not appear in a game.

Florial entered 2018 as one of the top prospects in the minor leagues. Playing for Tampa, he broke the hamate bone in his right wrist in May and required surgery, costing him three months of the season. 

In 2019, the Yankees invited Florial to spring training as a non-roster player. He suffered a non-displaced fracture in his right wrist during spring training. He returned to Tampa in June, where he played for the 2019 season.

New York Yankees
Florial was called up to the majors on August 28, 2020. He played in the first game of a doubleheader that same day against the New York Mets, where he got his first MLB hit. At the end of the day he was sent back to the minors. 

On July 20, 2021, Florial was called back up to the Yankees to replace the injured Trey Amburgey. He recorded his first major league RBI on a groundout to first base, and later hit his first major league home run; a solo shot off of pitcher Enyel De Los Santos of the Philadelphia Phillies.

References

External links

1997 births
Living people
Charleston RiverDogs players
Dominican Republic expatriate baseball players in the United States
Dominican Republic people of Haitian descent
Dominican Summer League Yankees players
Glendale Desert Dogs players
Gulf Coast Yankees players
Haitian baseball players
Haitian expatriate sportspeople in the United States
Haitian people of Dominican Republic descent
Major League Baseball outfielders
Major League Baseball players from the Dominican Republic
New York Yankees players
People from Barahona Province
Pulaski Yankees players
Scottsdale Scorpions players
Tampa Tarpons players
Tampa Yankees players
Scranton/Wilkes-Barre RailRiders players